The 1988 Gilgit massacre refers to the state-sponsored mass killing of  Shia civilians in the Gilgit District of Pakistan who revolted against military dictator Zia-ul-Haq's Sunni Islamist regime, responsible for vehement persecution of religious minorities as part of its Islamization program.

The massacre was preceded by anti-Shia riots in early May 1988, which were caused by a dispute over the sighting of the moon for Eid al-Fitr after Ramadan between Shia Muslims and Sunni Muslims. Local Sunnis, who were still fasting for Ramadan, had attacked the local Shias who had announced their commencement of Eid celebrations in Gilgit City, leading to violent clashes between the two sects.
In response to the riots and revolt against Zia-ul-Haq's regime, the Pakistan Army led an armed group of local Sunni tribals from Chilas, accompanied by Osama bin Laden-led Sunni militants from Afghanistan as well as Pakistan's North-West Frontier Province into Gilgit City and adjoining areas in order to suppress the revolt. It is estimated that anywhere between 150 and 900 Shia Muslims were killed in the resulting massacre and violence, in which entire villages were also burnt down. The massacre also saw the mass rape of hundreds of Shia Muslim women by Sunni tribesmen.

Background
Shia Muslims living in the Pakistani-administered territory of Gilgit-Baltistan have allegedly faced discrimination by the Pakistani government since its takeover of the region following the First Kashmir War between India and Pakistan in 1947–1948. The Shias claimed that under Pakistani administration, Sunni Muslims enjoyed inherent advantages in all business matters, were unilaterally awarded official positions and treated preferentially in legal cases. On 5 July 1977, General Muhammad Zia-ul-Haq led a coup d'état in Pakistan, establishing a military dictatorship, and committed himself throughout his tenure to converting Pakistan into a heavily conservative Islamic state and enforcing sharia law. Zia's state-sponsored Islamization increased the sectarian divisions between Sunni and Shia Muslims, and between Sunni Deobandis and Barelvis. The application of Sunni-centric laws throughout the country was divisive. Attacks on Shias (as well as other religious minorities) increased exponentially under the dictatorship of Zia-ul-Haq. The country's first major Shia–Sunni riots erupted in 1983 in Karachi, Sindh during the Islamic holy month of Muharram (which is especially significant for the Shia), and left at least 60 people dead. Further Muharram disturbances and riots followed over the course of another three years, spreading to Lahore and the province of Balochistan—leaving hundreds more dead. In July 1986, Sunnis and Shias clashed in the northwest town of Parachinar, near the Afghanistan–Pakistan border; many of them were equipped with locally-made automatic rifles. It is estimated that over 200 people died in this event of sectarian violence.

Conflict 

The first major anti-Shia riots in Gilgit District broke out in May 1988, stemming from a Shia–Sunni dispute over the sighting of the moon, which marks the end of the Islamic holy month of Ramadan and the beginning of Eid al-Fitr. When Shia Muslims in Gilgit City commenced their festivities for Eid, a group of local Sunni Muslims—who were still fasting for Ramadan as their religious leaders had not yet declared the sighting of the moon—attacked them, sparking a series of violent clashes between Gilgiti Sunnis and Shias. Following a period of calm for about four days, the Zia-ul-Haq military regime reportedly sent a contingent of militants from the North-West Frontier Province and Federally Administered Tribal Areas of Pakistan, accompanied by additional militants from neighbouring Afghanistan and local Sunni tribesmen from Chilas to "teach (the Shias) a lesson", which resulted in the deaths of hundreds of people.

Shia Muslims in Gilgit District were attacked and killed by a thousands-strong force of Sunni jihadists, led by Osama bin Laden and backed by the Pakistani military. Shia women living in Gilgit District were also mass-raped by local Sunni tribesmen as well as the bin Laden-led militants.

The Herald, the former monthly magazine publishing of the Dawn Media Group in Karachi, wrote in its April 1990 issue: In May 1988, low-intensity political rivalry and sectarian tension ignited into full-scale carnage as thousands of armed tribesmen from outside Gilgit district invaded Gilgit along the Karakoram Highway. Nobody stopped them. They destroyed crops and houses, lynched and burnt people to death in the villages around Gilgit town. The number of dead and injured was in the hundreds. But numbers alone tell nothing of the savagery of the invading hordes and the chilling impact it has left on these peaceful valleys.

Casualties
The exact casualties figure of the 1988 Gilgit massacre has been disputed. Some sources state that 150 to 400 people were killed while hundreds of others were injured, while other unofficial reports state that around 700 Shias were killed.

See also
Destruction of Kashmiri Shias
Persecution of minority Muslim groups
Sectarian violence among Muslims
Anti-Shi'ism
Shia–Sunni relations
Sunni Islam
Shia Islam
Freedom of religion in Pakistan
Persecution of religious minorities in Pakistan
Religious discrimination in Pakistan
Sectarian violence in Pakistan

Notes

References

Bibliography
 
 
 

Violence against Shia Muslims in Pakistan
1988 in Pakistan
Massacres in Pakistan-administered Kashmir
Massacres committed by Pakistan
Massacres in 1988
Gilgit-Baltistan